St. Matthew's Episcopal Church and Churchyard is a historic Episcopal church located on St. Mary's Road, Hillsborough, Orange County, North Carolina. The first three bays of the Gothic Revival-style brick church were built between 1825–1826, and its rear was extended by another bay in 1868.  It features a square entrance tower built in 1830, which was rebuilt in 1850. The tower has a pyramidal spire and lancet windows.

The property was listed on the National Register of Historic Places in 1971.  It is located in the Hillsborough Historic District.

References

External links
 Official Church Website

Episcopal church buildings in North Carolina
Historic American Buildings Survey in North Carolina
Churches on the National Register of Historic Places in North Carolina
Gothic Revival church buildings in North Carolina
Churches completed in 1826
19th-century Episcopal church buildings
Churches in Orange County, North Carolina
Hillsborough, North Carolina
National Register of Historic Places in Orange County, North Carolina
1826 establishments in North Carolina
Individually listed contributing properties to historic districts on the National Register in North Carolina